Chester William "Chet" Nimitz Jr. (February 17, 1915 – January 2, 2002) was an American submarine commander in the United States Navy during World War II and the Korean War, and a businessman. He was awarded the Navy Cross and three Silver Stars for valor in battle. He was the son of U.S. Navy Fleet Admiral Chester W. Nimitz.

Early life

Nimitz attended the United States Naval Academy at Annapolis, Maryland, graduating with the class of 1936.

Nimitz married Joan Leona Labern at the Mare Island Naval Shipyard on 18 June 1938. She was born in León, Nicaragua in 1912 to British parents, William Oscar Stonewall and Frances Mary (née Wells) Labern.  With her parents she returned to England at the outbreak of World War I in 1914, and was raised in England. Joan came to the United States in 1938 to study dentistry at the University of California Dental School in San Francisco, and met Chester at a cocktail party at Mare Island. She made news in 1944 when she failed her test to become a United States citizen; two days later she did become an American citizen.

The couple had three daughters, Frances Mary, Elizabeth Joan, and Sarah Catherine.

Naval career

Commands
 Served aboard the heavy cruiser 
 Served aboard the submarine  during the Philippines campaign (1941–1942)
 Commanded the U.S. Navy Submarine  and inflicted 14,756 tons of shipping losses upon the Imperial Japanese Navy during the period of August 22, 1944 – September 21, 1944
 Commanded the U.S. Navy Submarine 
 Commanded Submarine Squadron 6 based in Norfolk, Virginia
 Commanded the submarine tender  from August 11, 1956, to July 25, 1957

Later life
Chester Nimitz Jr. retired from the navy as rear admiral in 1957. He joined Texas Instruments, and spent four years there. He later joined Perkin-Elmer Corporation, a manufacturer of scientific instruments based in Norwalk, Connecticut. He became president, chief executive officer (CEO) and a director in 1965, and was elected chairman of the board in 1969, serving until retirement in 1980.

Nimitz was an honorary trustee and honorary member of the corporation of the Woods Hole Oceanographic Institution.

Death
The health of Nimitz and his wife, Joan, deteriorated in their later years. Joan was blind, and Nimitz had lost  due to a prolonged stomach disorder. He was also suffering from congestive heart failure. On January 2, 2002, Chester Nimitz Jr. committed voluntary suicide with his wife Joan by ingesting a quantity of sleeping pills in their home at a retirement residence in Needham, Massachusetts. He left a note stating:

Awards and decorations

References

External links
 

1915 births
2002 suicides
United States Navy personnel of the Korean War
United States Navy personnel of World War II
American people of German descent
Military personnel from New York City
People from Clinton Hill, Brooklyn
People from Needham, Massachusetts
Recipients of the Navy Cross (United States)
Recipients of the Silver Star
Drug-related suicides in Massachusetts
United States Navy rear admirals
United States Naval Academy alumni
Joint suicides
Military personnel from Massachusetts